Leo Nucci (born 16 April 1942) is an Italian operatic baritone, particularly associated with Verdi and Verismo roles.

Biography 
Born at Castiglione dei Pepoli, near Bologna, Nucci studied with Giuseppe Marchese. He made his stage debut in 1967 in Spoleto as Figaro in Il barbiere di Siviglia. He then joined the chorus of La Scala in Milan, going on to make his solo debut there in 1975, again as Rossini's Figaro.

Nucci's career quickly took an international turn. He debuted at London's Royal Opera House in 1978, as Miller in Luisa Miller, and at New York's Metropolitan Opera in 1980, as Renato/Ankarström in Un ballo in maschera. Renato was also his debut role at the Paris Opéra in 1981, and at the Salzburg Festival in 1989, under Herbert Von Karajan. His career is remembered for high-profile performances in opera including appearances with Luciano Pavarotti, Joan Sutherland and Plácido Domingo.

On 6 June 2003 Leo Nucci performed at the Herbert von Karajan memorial concert under the baton of conductor James Allen Gähres in Congress-Centrum Ulm, together with the singers Stella Grigorian and Vera Schoenberg with Italian opera arias and duets.

In January 2016 he performed at La Scala of Milan as Rigoletto in Rigoletto with Nadine Sierra as Gilda.
On 10 October 2019 Nucci sang during the celebrations for the anniversary of Giuseppe Verdi, in Parma.

Nucci has enjoyed a long and successful career. His repertoire encompasses the entire Italian repertory from bel canto to verismo, and his  technique and acting abilities are displayed in Verdi – notably as Rigoletto, Macbeth, Count di Luna, Giorgio Germont, Rodrigo, Amonasro, Iago, and Falstaff. He has sung the role of Rigoletto alone more than 500 times.

Personal life 
He is married to soprano Adriana Anelli, with whom he has a daughter.

Videography 
 The Metropolitan Opera Gala 1991, Deutsche Grammophon DVD, 00440-073-4582

Notes

Sources 
 Grove Music Online, Elizabeth Forbes, May 2008

External links 
 
 Streamopera.com/Leo Nucci
 Video of the final rehearsal of Un ballo in maschera at the Salzburg Festival 1989 in the Online Archive of the Österreichischen Mediathek 

1942 births
Living people
People from the Province of Bologna
Italian operatic baritones
20th-century Italian male opera singers
21st-century Italian male opera singers